Broughshane (formerly spelt Brughshane) is a large village in County Antrim, Northern Ireland. It is part of Mid and East Antrim District Council and had a population of 2,879 people in the 2011 Census.

Its name comes from the Irish for "Shane's dwelling", and seemingly refers to a castle of Shane mac Brian O'Neill, ruler of the Gaelic territory of Lower Clannaboy from 1595 to 1617, which formerly stood on the north side of the village street. The quaint pub, The Thatch Inn, has a thatched roof and is a Grade B+ listed building.

Broughshane is known as the 'Garden Village of Ulster' with the motto 'People, Plants and Pride growing Together'.  The village recently won Channel Four's 'UK Village of the Year', Ulster in Bloom, Britain in Bloom and Entente Floral (Europe in Bloom).  In 2007 and again in 2012, the village won 'Champion of Champions' award in the Britain in Bloom competition. It has also won the All Ireland Tidy Town Award.

Volunteers have established in the area around the village pond, a wildlife area which has some of every species of swan and many rare types of geese etc.

Notable people 
Broughshane was the ancestral home of Sir George White VC, the most decorated soldier in the British Army and the hero of the Siege of Ladysmith. There is a memorial in the Presbyterian Church graveyard.
His son, Captain James Robert "Jack" White, co-founded the Irish Citizen Army during the Dublin Lockout and later went on to fight the Fascist uprising in the Spanish Civil War.
Sir James Russell, Chief Justice of Hong Kong, was from Broughshane and is buried there.
Guy Wilson, horticulturalist and nurseryman.
Actor James Nesbitt grew up in Broughshane before moving to Coleraine.
Ireland national rugby union team and British and Irish Lions rugby player David Humphreys, from Broughshane, winning the Triple Crown and captaining the Barbarian F.C. in his illustrious career.
Ulster Rugby player Ian Humphreys, brother of David Humphreys is from Broughshane.
British & Irish Lions, Ireland national rugby union, Barbarian F.C, Ulster Rugby & Ballymena RFC  rugby player Steve Smith lives in Broughshane, Ballymena

Sport 
Broughshane has two football teams.
Braid United play in the Ballymena Saturday Morning League
Raceview F.C. play in the Ballymena and Provincial League.
Both clubs play their home matches at the village's football pitch at Knockan Road. Since 2008 the pitch has also been used as a venue for Milk Cup games.

Ballymena Golf Club is situated in the outskirts of Broughshane.

Ballymena R.F.C. rugby Grounds are on the road linking Ballymena to Broughshane.

Demography 
Broughshane had a population of 2,879 people (1,243 households) in the 2011 Census.
On Census day in 2011:
 19.00% were under 16 years old and 21.74% were aged 65 and above;
 47.48% of the population were male and 52.52% were female; and
 4.52% were from a Catholic community background and 89.65% were from a 'Protestant and Other Christian (including Christian related)' community background.

References 

Broughshane & District Community Association's Official Website - www.broughshane.org.uk/

External links
Welcome to Broughshane - News and information relating to the village and the greater Braid Valley area as well as a picturesque photograph gallery

Villages in County Antrim